The Venezuelan climbing mouse (Rhipidomys venezuelae) is a species of rodent in the family Cricetidae.
It is found in Colombia, Tobago, and Venezuela.

References

Rhipidomys
Mammals of Colombia
Mammals of Venezuela
Mammals of Trinidad and Tobago
Mammals of the Caribbean
Mammals described in 1896
Taxa named by Oldfield Thomas
Taxonomy articles created by Polbot